Maja Watt Adamsen (born 7 September 1978) is a road cyclist from Denmark. She represented her nation at the 2005, 2007 and 2008 UCI Road World Championships.

References

External links
 profile at Procyclingstats.com

1978 births
Danish female cyclists
Living people
21st-century Danish women